Leggera may refer to:
 Leggera (album), by Italian singer Mina
 Leggera (horse), a racehorse